Cirrus Mountain is a  mountain summit located in the upper North Saskatchewan River valley on the shared boundary between Banff National Park and White Goat Wilderness Area, in the Canadian Rockies of Alberta, Canada. Cirrus Mountain is situated along the east side the Icefields Parkway midway between Saskatchewan Crossing and Sunwapta Pass. The nearest higher peak is Mount Stewart,  to the north-northeast.

History

In 1928, Morrison P. Bridgland suggested the name Mount Huntington for the mountain, but it was not adopted. However, the Huntington name endures as the name of the Huntington Glacier below the eastern aspect of the summit. The mountain was instead named Cirrus Mountain, and that toponym was officially adopted in 1935 by the Geographical Names Board of Canada. The first ascent of the mountain was accomplished in 1939 by C.B. Sissons and H.J. Sissons.

Geology

Like other mountains in Banff Park, Cirrus Mountain is composed of sedimentary rock laid down from the Precambrian to Jurassic periods. Formed in shallow seas, this sedimentary rock was pushed east and over the top of younger rock during the Laramide orogeny. The east aspect of Cirrus Mountain is covered by expansive glacial ice known as the Huntington Glacier.

Climate

Based on the Köppen climate classification, Cirrus Mountain is located in a subarctic climate with cold, snowy winters, and mild summers. Winter temperatures can drop below -20 °C with wind chill factors below -30 °C. Weather conditions during winter make the Weeping Wall at the base of Cirrus Mountain's west face the premier place for ice climbing in the Canadian Rockies. Precipitation runoff from Cirrus Mountain drains into tributaries of the North Saskatchewan River.

Ice Climbing Routes

Ice Climbing Routes with grades on Cirrus Mountain

 Polar Circus - WI5
 Snivelling Gully - WI3
 Weeping Wall - WI3-6
 Weeping Pillar - WI6

Gallery

See also
 Geography of Alberta

References

External links
 Weather forecast: Cirrus Mountain
 Parks Canada web site:Banff National Park
 Cirrus Mountain (photo): Flickr
 2023 fatality at Polar Circus: Climbing.com

Three-thousanders of Alberta
Mountains of Banff National Park
Canadian Rockies
Alberta's Rockies